Ian James Abraham (born 24 October 1941) is a former Australian rules footballer, who played with Collingwood in the Victorian Football League (VFL).

Abraham joined Collingwood from Won Wron at the start of the 1960 season. He made his debut versus Geelong in Round 11 that year, played the next week versus Fitzroy and kicked two goals in each match.

He was chosen for the first game of the 1961 season against Geelong but did not kick any goals and was not selected for Collingwood again.

References

Sources
 Holmesby, Russell & Main, Jim (2007). The Encyclopedia of AFL Footballers. 7th ed. Melbourne: Bas Publishing.

External links

Ian Abraham's playing statistics from The VFA Project
Ian Abraham's playing statistics from WAFL Footy Facts

1941 births
Australian rules footballers from Victoria (Australia)
Collingwood Football Club players
Dandenong Football Club players
Claremont Football Club players
Living people